The following lists the events for the year 2023 in Canada.

Incumbents

The Crown
Monarch – Charles III

Federal government
Governor General – Mary Simon
Prime Minister – Justin Trudeau
Parliament – 44th

Provincial governments

Lieutenant Governors
Lieutenant Governor of Alberta – Salma Lakhani
Lieutenant Governor of British Columbia – Janet Austin
Lieutenant Governor of Manitoba –  Anita Neville
Lieutenant Governor of New Brunswick – Brenda Murphy
Lieutenant Governor of Newfoundland and Labrador – Judy Foote
Lieutenant Governor of Nova Scotia – Arthur LeBlanc
Lieutenant Governor of Ontario – Elizabeth Dowdeswell
Lieutenant Governor of Prince Edward Island – Antoinette Perry
Lieutenant Governor of Quebec – J. Michel Doyon
Lieutenant Governor of Saskatchewan – Russell Mirasty

Premiers
Premier of Alberta – Danielle Smith
Premier of British Columbia – David Eby
Premier of Manitoba – Heather Stefanson
Premier of New Brunswick – Blaine Higgs
Premier of Newfoundland and Labrador – Andrew Furey
Premier of Nova Scotia – Tim Houston 
Premier of Ontario – Doug Ford
Premier of Prince Edward Island – Dennis King
Premier of Quebec – François Legault 
Premier of Saskatchewan – Scott Moe

Territorial governments

Commissioners
Commissioner of Northwest Territories – Margaret Thom
Commissioner of Nunavut – Eva Aariak 
Commissioner of Yukon – Angélique Bernard

Premiers
Premier of Northwest Territories – Caroline Cochrane
Premier of Nunavut – P. J. Akeeagok
Premier of Yukon – Sandy Silver (until January 14); then Ranj Pillai

Events

January 
January 1 – Canada enacts a law prohibiting foreigners, except for immigrants and permanent residents, from acquiring residential areas in the country for two years in response to a real-estate bubble.
January 18 – Defence Minister Anita Anand announces that the country is donating 200 Senator APCs to Ukraine to aid them during the war.
January 21 – The government agreed to pay C$2.8 billion to settle a class-action lawsuit regarding compensation for the effects of residential schools to First Nations.
January 26:
 Anand announces that Canada is sending four Leopard 2A4 tanks to Ukraine, the first Canadian tanks sent to the country. This move comes a day after Germany and the United States reversed their initial hesitations and announced a shipment of tanks to Ukraine as well.
 Prime Minister Justin Trudeau appointed Amira Elghawaby as Canada's first special representative on combatting Islamophobia for a four-year term.  Her appointment was not only criticized by the Quebec government and the Parti Québécois, but they also called for her to resign due to remarks she said about Quebecers in 2019.

February 

 February 2 – In response to a detected Chinese balloon flying over Canadian and American airspace, Cong Peiwu, the Chinese ambassador to Canada, was summoned by officials, while the Canadian Armed Forces said in a statement that the incident posed no danger to Canadians. The balloon was shot down two days later off the coast of the U.S. state of South Carolina by a missile.
 February 8 – A man crashed a bus into a daycare in Laval, Quebec, killing two children and injuring six others. The man, identified to be 51-year-old Pierre Ny St-Amand, was arrested.
 February 11 – 2023 Yukon high-altitude object: Justin Trudeau orders the takedown of an unidentified object over Yukon, which is later shot down by a United States Air Force F-22 Raptor using a AIM-9X Sidewinder. The Canadian Armed Forces has been deployed to collect and analyze the object.
February 13 – At least twelve people are injured in an explosion at a construction site in Ottawa.
February 18 – March 5 – The 2023 Canada Winter Games are held in Prince Edward Island.
February 27 – March 5 – The 2023 World Junior Figure Skating Championships are held in Calgary, Alberta.
February 28 – Canada bans social media platform TikTok from all government-issued devices, citing "an unacceptable level of risk to privacy and security" from the Chinese-owned app.

March 

March 13:
The Juno Awards of 2023 are held in Edmonton, Alberta.
Guillaume Cliche-Rivard from Québec solidaire is elected in the 2023 Saint-Henri—Sainte-Anne provincial by-election.
A pickup truck hit eleven pedestrians in Amqui, Quebec, killing two and injuring nine. The driver was arrested after attempting to flee the scene.

Scheduled and unscheduled events

March
March 26 – 2023 Green Party of Manitoba leadership election

April
April 3 – 2023 Prince Edward Island general election
April 5 – The 2023 IIHF Women's World Championship is held in Brampton, Ontario.
April 9 – The 2023 Canadian Ringette Championships are held in Regina, Saskatchewan. National champions are decided in U16, U19, and National Ringette League divisions.

May
May 23 – 2023 Alberta general election

June
June 26 – 2023 Toronto mayoral by-election

October
October 3 – 2023 Manitoba general election

November
November 19 – The 110th Grey Cup will be held in Hamilton, Ontario.

Deaths

January 
January 1 – Bobby Rivard, ice hockey player (b. 1939)
January 5
Martin Fabi, Hungarian-born football player (b. 1942)
Michael Snow, filmmaker and artist (b. 1928)
January 8 – Harold Martens, rancher, farmer, and politician (b. 1941)
January 9 – George S. Zimbel, American-Canadian documentary photographer (b. 1929)
January 12 – Robbie Bachman, drummer (b. 1953)
January 14 – David Onley, broadcaster, author, and the 28th lieutenant governor of Ontario (b. 1950)
January 15 – Gino Odjick, ice hockey player (b. 1970)
January 16
Ann Thomas Callahan, nurse (b. 1935)
Alan Glass, multidisciplinary artist and teacher (b. 1932)
January 17 – Leon Dubinsky, actor, theatre director, and composer (b. 1950)
January 21 – René Laurin, politician (b. 1940)
January 25 – Noah Cowan, executive director of SFFILM and artistic director of TIFF Bell Lightbox (b. 1967)
January 27 – Floyd Sneed, drummer (b. 1942)
January 28
Eva Kushner, Czechoslovakian-born academic (b. 1929)
Viola Léger, American-born actress and politician (b. 1930)
Landon Pearson, politician and children's rights advocate (b. 1930)
January 29
Hazel McCallion, businesswoman, politician, and Mayor of Mississauga (b. 1921)
George R. Robertson, actor (b. 1933)
January 30 – Bobby Hull, ice hockey player (b. 1939)

February 
February 1 – Terence Dickinson, astrophotographer and amateur astronomer (b. 1943)
February 2
Fred, groundhog whose behaviour was used to predict weather on Groundhog Day
Trevor Boys, race car driver (b. 1957)
Lanny Poffo, American-Canadian professional wrestler, motivational speaker, poet, and actor (b. 1954)
February 5
Roslyn Swartzman, printmaker, painter, and sculptor (b. 1931)
Kaye Vaughan, American-born football player (b. 1931)
February 7 – Mendelson Joe, singer-songwriter, guitarist, painter, and political activist (b. 1944)
February 10 – Ben Steinberg, composer, conductor, and music educator (b. 1930)
February 12 – Billy Two Rivers, professional wrestler, actor, and chief of the Mohawks of Kahnawà:ke (b. 1935)
February 13
Guido Basso, jazz musician (b. 1937)
Nadine Girault, politician (b. 1959)
February 15 – Paul Jerrard, ice hockey player and coach (b. 1965)
February 16 – Helen Fogwill Porter, writer, educator, and activist (b. 1930)
February 17 – Don Blackburn, ice hockey player (b. 1938)
February 18 – Peter Herrndorf, Dutch-born lawyer and media businessman (b. 1940)
February 23 – Andrée Desautels, musician, musicologist, and music educator (b. 1923)
February 25 – Gordon Pinsent, actor (b. 1930)

March 
March 1 – Wally Fawkes, British-Canadian jazz clarinettist and satirical cartoonist (b. 1924)
March 6 – Ken Money, astronaut, scientist, and Olympic high jumper (b. 1935)
March 13 – Glen Weir, football player (b. 1951)
March 14 – Louisette Dussault, actress and writer (b. 1940)
March 16 – Claude Fournier, filmmaker (b. 1931)

See also 
 2023 Canadian electoral calendar
 2023 in Canadian soccer
 2023 in Canadian music
 2023 in Canadian television

Notes

References

 
Canada
Canada
2020s in Canada
Years in Canada
Years of the 21st century in Canada